The 2016–17 Air Force Falcons men's basketball team represented the United States Air Force Academy during the 2016–17 NCAA Division I men's basketball season. The Falcons, led by fifth-year head coach Dave Pilipovich, played their home games at the Clune Arena on the Air Force Academy's main campus in Colorado Springs, Colorado as members of the Mountain West Conference. They finished the season 12–21, 4–14 in Mountain West play to finish in a tie for tenth place. They defeated Wyoming in the first round of the Mountain West tournament to advance to the quarterfinals where they lost to Colorado State.

Previous season 
The Falcons finished the 2015–16 season 14–18, 5–13 in Mountain West play to finish in tenth place in conference. They lost in the first round of the Mountain West tournament to UNLV.

Departures

Recruiting Class of 2016

Roster

Schedule and results 

|-
!colspan=9 style=| Exhibition

|-
!colspan=9 style=| Non-conference regular season

|-
!colspan=9 style=| Mountain West regular season

|-
!colspan=9 style=| Mountain West tournament

See also
2016–17 Air Force Falcons women's basketball team

References 

Air Force
Air Force Falcons men's basketball seasons
Air Force Falcons
Air Force Falcons